Adalbert Baltes (27 July 1916 in Wiesbaden  – 5 April 1992) was a German inventor of the Cinetarium and a film producer. His short film Plastik im Freien was presented at the 1954 Cannes Film Festival.

References

External links 
 Baltes, Adalbert

20th-century German inventors
German film producers
1916 births
1992 deaths
People from Wiesbaden
Film people from Hesse